Madhupur Rani Bhabani Model-govt High School (Bengali : মধুপুর রানী ভবানী মডেল-সরকারি উচ্চ বিদ্যালয়  ) also known as Madhupur Rani Bhabani Pilot High School is a high school located in Madhupur Upazila, Tangail, Dhaka, Bangladesh. The school offers education for students ranging from six to Secondary School Certificate (approximately ages 7 to 15). The school is under the direct control of the Ministry of Education

Location
Madhupur Rani Bhabani Model Govt. High School is one Km from Madhupur bus stand, 45 km from Tangail, Mymensingh and Jamalpur district headquarters and 135 km from Dhaka city. The school is situated by the side of Tangail-Mymensingh highway.

Academic performance
Madhupur Rani Bhabani Model Govt. High School's results from 2007 to 2010 for the Secondary School Certificate level examinations are as follows:

See also
Madhupur Shahid Smrity Higher Secondary School
Madhupur College

References

Education in Tangail
Education in Madhupur
High schools in Bangladesh
Education in Bangladesh
1939 establishments in India